Tammy Tell Me True is a 1961 American Eastmancolor comedy film directed by Harry Keller and starring Sandra Dee and John Gavin, Charles Drake, Virginia Grey and Julia Meade.

The film, the second in the series, was based on Cid Ricketts Sumner's 1959 novel of the same name, which the New York Times had described as "a cheerful change of pace from current novels of conflict and depression".

Plot
Tammy is waiting to hear from her lover Pete, who has gone to agricultural college. She decides to go to college to improve herself. Tammy becomes a paid companion for a crusty old lady and falls for a handsome man.

Cast
Sandra Dee as Tambrey "Tammy" Tyree
John Gavin as Tom Freeman
Charles Drake as Buford Woodly
Virginia Grey as "Miss" Jenks
Julia Meade as Suzanne Rook
Beulah Bondi as Mrs. Call
Cecil Kellaway as Captain Joe
Edgar Buchanan as Judge Carver
Gigi Perreau as Rita
Juanita Moore as Della
Hayden Rorke as Joshua Welling
 Ward Ramsey as Caleb Slade
Henry Corden as Captain Armand
Don Dorrell as Roger 
Patricia McNulty as Joan 
Stefanie Powers as Kay (credited as 'Taffy Paul')
 Lowell Brown as John 
 Bill Herrin as Phil (as William Herrin)
Catherine McLeod as Mrs. Bateman
Ross Elliott as Professor Bateman
Ned Wever as Dr. Stach

Production
Sandra Dee was announced for the lead role in September 1960.

Reception
The Chicago Tribune called it "calculated cuteness... relieved by a likeable performance from Sandra Dee." The Washington Post called it "infinitely inferior to the first Tammy, everything about the film is false, especially the aggressive Sandra Dee, whose primpsy whimsy wardrobe cannot disguise the acquisitive gaze in her give-away eyes."

In a 1974 interview, Gavin criticised the film but said it "haunts the tube like a permanent miasma. You can't do worse than that."

References

External links
 
 

1961 romantic comedy films
1961 films
1960s teen films
American romantic comedy films
Tammy (film series)
Universal Pictures films
Films directed by Harry Keller
Films produced by Ross Hunter
Films adapted into comics
Films based on American novels
1960s English-language films
1960s American films